Affection is often associated with a feeling or type of love.

Affection may also refer to:
Affection (linguistics), in Celtic linguistics, the fronting of vowels in the main syllable of a word
Affection (Lisa Stansfield album), 1989
Affection (Jody Watley album), 1995
"Affection" (song), a 1995 song from the Jody Watley album
Affection (Kumi Koda album), 2002
A song from The All-American Rejects' album Kids in the Street, 2012
 Affection (1966 film), a 1966 Hong Kong film
Affection (film), a 1972 Bulgarian film
Affectionate (EP), an EP by Venetian Snares
Doctrine of the affections, esthetic theory of the Baroque era

See also
Affect (disambiguation)
Infection (disambiguation)